Big Valley is a village in central Alberta, Canada that is southeast of Red Deer.

History

Ranching era 
Big Valley Alberta began to be settled even before 1910; people realized the value of the rich soil and natural grass known as Prairie Wool.  Settlers began cattle farming operations and the town expanded.  The Imperial Lease of land south-east of Big Valley consisted of thousands of acres of land owned by Pat Burns.  Most of the land became an ecological reserve to preserve its natural flora.

Rail era 
In 1911 the Canadian Northern Railway (CNoR) began to lay track through Big Valley.  In 1912 Big Valley built a thriving terminal with a big roundhouse, stockyards, rail yards, water tower, coal-dock, general railway maintenance and repair facilities.  It became a village in 1914 with a population of 500 growing to 803 in 1920 when it became a town.   After the merger of Canadian Northern Railway and Grand Trunk Pacific railways to create Canadian National Railway (CNR) they believed there was no need of a railway to go through Big Valley.  There are still the remains of the railway you can see with a walking self-tour.

In November 1986 Central Western Railway Corp. (later Railink) purchased the portion of CNR track from Ferlow Junction (seven miles south of Camrose) to Munson Junction (about seven miles (11 km) north of Drumheller).  They began to haul grain along these lines from elevator to elevator on a regular basis.

Railink has sold most of the line to a salvage company and now the tracks extend from Stettler to Big Valley.  This remaining portion is owned by a group named the East Central Alberta Heritage Society (ECHAC).  Alberta Prairie Steam Tours (a Stettler-based group) rents the use of the track, from ECHAC, for their steam train excursions.

Coal era 
Several small mines were later developed on the outskirts of Big Valley; but the largest of these many mines (Big Valley Collieries) opened in 1912. Big Valley coal was all of a softer variety, suitable only for residential heating. The demand for this soft coal remained strong for many years and the mines continued to operate almost up to the time that gas and oil was discovered in Big Valley in 1950.

Oil boom 
Up until the early 1950s, coal had been the commodity mined in the area. In the late 1940s, a blizzard in the Alberta foothills pushed the seismic operations eastward to Stettler. The move resulted in the discovery of oil near Big Valley. But more importantly, it spawned extensive oil and gas exploration throughout the county. This well was completed in September 1950. Once developed, the Fenn-Big Valley field covered an area of 78.2 hectares (30.2 square miles). This field produced over 51 million cubic metres (321 million barrels) of oil and over 2.4 billion cubic metres (85 billion cubic feet) of solution gas. Small amounts of oil and gas remain to be produced from this field. The oil and gas formation lies 1660 metres (5,445 ft) below the surface of the ground. At its peak, the Fenn-Big Valley Field produced 5,352 cubic metres (35,000 barrels) of oil a day for Gulf and similar amounts for Shell and Esso. The original portion of No. 7 well alone produced 95,700 cubic metres (626,000 barrels) of oil during its lifetime. Today, many of the pump jacks that dot the Big Valley landscape stand idle.

A local symbol of the importance of the petroleum industry is an oil pumper displayed in Memorial Park.

Historical places 
St. Edmund's Church

St. Edmund's Anglican Church on the hill (the Blue Church) was built in 1916.  It was started by a financial gift from Mrs. Caroline Leffler (in England) who raised the $500.00 down payment by making, and selling, children's clothing.  She sent the money to the Anglican Diocese in Calgary, asking that it be used to help start an Anglican church anywhere in western Canada that they saw fit.  At that time Big Valley, with its booming mining, ranching, and railroading industries in full swing, made it a logical spot for a new church. Walter Dennis, a local craftsman, built St. Frances Museum.

The building contains the original pews (with a few additions), pump organ, and other furnishings.  The last regular church service was held in the 1960s and the building soon became very weather-worn.  A nearly broke Homecoming 1974 group obtained some unclaimed blue paint from a local lumber yard and the once cream-coloured church became blue.

Demographics 

In the 2016 Census of Population conducted by Statistics Canada, the Village of Big Valley recorded a population of 346 living in 167 of its 189 total private dwellings, a  change from its 2011 population of 364.

Geography 
Big Valley is located in central Alberta.  The Village of Big Valley is located south of Stettler and is a busy little community one kilometre off Highway 56. Big Valley is centrally located in the southern part of the Battle River Tourist zone.

Big Valley has seen a 10.4% increase in population over the period of 1996 and 2001.

Location 
32 km south of Stettler on Highway 56
60 km north of Drumheller on Highway 56
80 km east of Innisfail on Highway 590
204 km southeast of Edmonton

Leisure

Arts and culture 
As of the summer of 2005 Big Valley Amphitheatre will be hosting local talent including old time and modern country music, sing-a-longs and storytelling sessions.

On June 5, 2007, the Big Valley Creation Science Museum was opened in the village. The museum claims scientific evidence for the Genesis creation.

Golf 
The Big Valley Golf Course is on the western edge of the village. It's a challenging nine-hole course with many hills on sand greens.

Parks 
Ball Diamonds

Big Valley has a number of community ball teams and also hosts tournaments every year. Managed by the Big Valley Agricultural Society, facilities include ball diamonds, a playground, and access to the Agriplex for food services and dances.

Elks Playgrounds

There are several playgrounds available for the children of Big Valley, including the Elks Playground, the playground at the ball diamond and the playground at the Big Valley School.

Memorial Park

Memorial Park is a beautiful spot in the village to enjoy a picnic lunch.  There is a War Memorial in the park where respect is paid to the significant number of men who fought for Canada in wartime.  Memorial Park is located at 121 Main Street, West.

Facilities 
Big Valley Agriplex

The Agriplex is Big Valley's main ice facility.  It has seating for approximately 800 people and is home to many minor hockey games and tournaments.  Time is also available for public skating.

Tennis Courts

Big Valley currently has two tennis courts available to residents and visitors of Big Valley that can also be used for tennis, playing basketball and skateboarding.

Education 
Big Valley School - part of Clearview Public Schools

Notable people 
 Skeeter Thurston, rodeo competitor
 Zeke Thurston, rodeo world champion

See also 
List of communities in Alberta
List of villages in Alberta

References

External links 

1914 establishments in Alberta
Villages in Alberta